Ko Im-pyo is a South Korean film editor.

Selected filmography
First Kiss (1998)
If the Sun Rises in the West (1998)
Attack the Gas Station (1999)
Kick the Moon (2001)
A.F.R.I.K.A. (2002)
Public Enemy (2002)
My Teacher, Mr. Kim (2003)
My Wife is a Gangster 2 (2003)
A Tale of Two Sisters (2003)
Too Beautiful to Lie (2004)
100 Days with Mr. Arrogant (2004)
Dance with the Wind (2004)
Another Public Enemy (2005)
Duelist (2005)
Running Wild (2006)
The Perfect Couple (2007)
Small Town Rivals (2007)
Attack the Gas Station 2 (2010)
Moss (2010)

Awards 
2010 18th Chunsa Film Art Awards: Best Editing (Moss)

External links 
 
 
 

Living people
South Korean film editors
1962 births